Eagle Lake is a lake at  elevation in Lassen County approximately  north of Susanville, California. An endorheic alkaline lake, it is the second largest natural lake entirely in the state of California, United States.

Ecology
Eagle Lake is home to osprey (Pandion haliaetus) and bald eagles (Haliaeetus leucocephalus), from which it gets its name.

Eagle Lake is the only watershed which supports native Eagle Lake trout (Oncorhynchus mykiss aquilarum). These rainbow trout grow to very large sizes, possibly having evolved to live longer as low flows often restrict spawning runs up their main spawning stream, Pine Creek. Since these Modoc Lakes are high in alkalinity, the trout have evolved to be the only known trout subspecies capable of surviving in the alkaline waters of Eagle Lake. Eagle Lake Rainbow descendants, however, are planted with high success in many other lakes in California. These trout were once so abundant that there was a commercial fishery for them in the late 19th century. At the same time, extensive logging and heavy livestock grazing caused Pine Creek to change from a permanent to an intermittent stream in its lower reaches. In the early 1950s the few remaining eagle lake rainbow trout at the mouth of Pine Creek were rescued and used to start a hatchery program to maintain the species and the sport fishery. Because of the complete dependence of Eagle Lake rainbow trout on hatchery production, the American Fisheries Society considers it to be a threatened species and NatureServe has listed it as critically imperiled. Peter Moyle considers it to be one of the most endangered salmonids in California. However, a petition for listing the Eagle Lake rainbow trout as a threatened species was rejected by the U.S. Fish and Wildlife Service in 1994, and a similar petition was rejected by the California State Fish and Game Commission in 2004. From 2007 to 2009 Bogard Spring Creek, a tributary to Pine Creek, was electrofished to remove non-native brook trout (Salvelinus fontinalis).

Non-native fish have not survived in the lake because of its high alkalinity, although in the early 1900s during a period of higher lake levels and falling alkalinity, Largemouth bass (Micropterus salmoides) and Brown bullhead (Ameiurus nebulosus) became abundant in the lake for some years.

Historically American white pelicans (Pelecanus erythrorhynchos) nested on Eagle Lake. They suffered from hunting by locals who mistakenly thought the pelicans ate the native trout and stopped nesting completely after 1932, when water was exported for agricultural irrigation and lowered the lake level by 3 meters, changing their nesting island into a less desirable peninsula ("Pelican Point").

Watershed and tributaries
Eagle Lake was once part of a large lake on the Modoc Plateau millions of years ago.

The tributaries of Eagle Lake (beginning in the lake's north end and going clockwise) are Cleghorn Creek, Papoose Creek, Merrill Creek, and Pine Creek. Now an intermittent stream; only the upper  of Pine Creek has perennial flow. In 1923 the Leon Bly Tunnel was constructed to export lake water to the Honey Lake Valley via Willow Creek, a tributary of the Susan River. However, a 1990 study found that lake water still flows through the tunnel although tunnel fish are from the Willow Creek assemblage.

See also
 List of lakes in California

References

External links
 Eagle Lake Biological Field Station
 Wild Eagle Lake Rainbow Trout Restoration Project Video (2007)

Endorheic lakes of California
Lakes of Lassen County, California
Lakes of the Great Basin
Lakes of Northern California
Lakes of California